The 1983 Labour Party leadership election was an election in the United Kingdom for the leadership of the Labour Party. It occurred when then leader Michael Foot resigned after winning only 209 seats at the 1983 general election, a loss of 60 seats compared to their performance at the previous election four years earlier. This was the worst showing for Labour since 1935 until 2019.

Neil Kinnock was elected Leader with 71% of the Electoral College vote; runner-up Roy Hattersley stood simultaneously for Deputy Leader and was elected as Deputy.

The election took place at the Labour Party Conference, with affiliated trade unions holding 40% of the votes, delegates from Constituency Labour Parties holding 30% of the votes, and the Parliamentary Labour Party holding the final 30% of the votes.

Background
Soon after the 1983 election defeat it became clear that there was pressure on Foot to resign, with David Basnett, chairman of Trade Unions for Labour Victory which funded the campaign, arguing for a quick announcement on the future of the leadership saying "the sooner it is done the better".  On 12 June 1983, three days after the general election, Clive Jenkins announced, on behalf of the Association of Scientific, Technical and Managerial Staffs, that his union had nominated Foot for re-election. This allowed Foot to refuse and declare his intention to stand down.

Early speculation days after the election saw the possible candidates as Denis Healey, Neil Kinnock, Roy Hattersley, Gerald Kaufman and Peter Shore. However, almost immediately after Foot announced his intention to resign, Clive Jenkins announced that his union had switched its nomination to Kinnock, which he accepted. Other union leaders contributed support for Kinnock and Hattersley. Basnett stated on Channel 4 "I will tell you who I think ought to be the leadership team – it ought to be Kinnock and Hattersley" while Gavin Laird, general secretary of the Amalgamated Union of Engineering Workers, backed Hattersley as leader, Kinnock as his deputy.

Shortly after Foot's decision to stand-down became known, Denis Healey, the Deputy Leader of the Party, announced he too would resign from his position and would not seek to become party leader. However he confirmed he intended to continue to play a leading role in the House of Commons and that he would seek election to the Shadow Cabinet. Another potential candidate, Tony Benn was ruled out of the running as only MPs were eligible to stand for the position. Benn was out of Parliament, having lost his seat at the General Election a few days earlier.

Candidates
 Roy Hattersley, Shadow Home Secretary, Member of Parliament for Birmingham Sparkbrook
 Eric Heffer, Shadow Minister for Europe, Member of Parliament for Liverpool Walton
 Neil Kinnock, Shadow Secretary of State for Education, Member of Parliament for Islwyn
 Peter Shore, Shadow Chancellor of the Exchequer, Member of Parliament for Bethnal Green and Stepney

Results
Of the four contenders who stood to replace Foot, Kinnock was favoured to win. The results of the election, held at the Labour Party Conference, were:

Neil Kinnock won the election with an outright majority and Roy Hattersley became his deputy, beating Michael Meacher. Kinnock remained leader until 1992. Kinnock fought in two further elections, both unsuccessfully. He failed to beat Margaret Thatcher in the 1987 general election despite gaining some seats. Kinnock resigned as leader following a fourth successive Labour defeat at the hands of John Major in the 1992 election. He resigned as leader shortly afterwards, paving the way for John Smith.

See also
 1983 Labour Party deputy leadership election

Notes

External links
Labour Party 

1983
1983 elections in the United Kingdom
Neil Kinnock
Labour Party leadership election (UK)